Defy Appliances is a South African manufacturing company and is the largest manufacturer and distributor of major domestic appliances in Southern Africa.  The company manufactures and develops a range of large appliances from gas stoves, refrigerators, washing machines and tumble dryers to continuous clean ovens and convection ovens.

It currently operates three factories:

 Jacobs (Durban) — manufactures freestanding stoves, built-in ovens and hobs, tumble dryers.
 Ezakheni (Ladysmith) — manufactures electric chest freezers and electric refrigerators.
 eMonti (East London) — manufactures electric refrigerators.

Defy Appliances was founded in the 1905 in Wentworth, KwaZulu-Natal by John Skinner and Sir Benjamin Greenacre. The company manufactured its first product, electric stoves, in 1932. The Durban Falkirk Iron Company (DFI, now DEFY) moved the foundry from Jacobs to Newcastle, around 1987. In July 2011, the company was bought by Turkish based Arçelik for US$324-million as part of its plan to expand into emerging markets in Africa.

References 

Companies based in Durban
Electronics companies established in 1905
Home appliance manufacturers of South Africa
South African brands
2011 mergers and acquisitions
1905 establishments in the Colony of Natal
Companies based in KwaZulu-Natal